Queen Dorothea may refer to:
Dorothea of Bulgaria, Queen consort of Bosnia (died in cca. 1390)
Dorothea of Brandenburg, Queen consort of Denmark, Sweden and Norway (1430/31–1495)
Dorothea of Saxe-Lauenburg, Queen consort of Denmark and Norway (1511–1571)